Dennis Eugene Scott Jr. (born September 5, 1968) is an American former professional basketball player.  A  small forward from Georgia Tech, and the 1990 ACC Men's Basketball Player of the Year, Scott was selected by the Orlando Magic with the fourth pick of the 1990 NBA draft after being the leading scorer on a Yellow Jackets team that made the Final Four, and comprising one portion of Georgia Tech's "Lethal Weapon 3" attack featuring Scott, Kenny Anderson and Brian Oliver.

Basketball career

High school
Scott played for Coach Stu Vetter at Flint Hill in Oakton, Virginia. Flint Hill Prep finished ranked first in the nation Scott's senior year (1987) as ranked by USA Today. In his junior year at Flint Hill Prep, his team finished ranked second in the nation by USA Today and first as ranked by Blue Ribbon yearbook. Given his size, strength, shooting ability, and quickness Scott played every position at one time or another during his high school career.

College career
Scott had an excellent college career for the Yellow Jackets, leading them to the NCAA Tournament each year that he played. During his junior season, 1989–90, he led the Yellow Jackets on to win the ACC Tournament Championship. He was named ACC Player of the Year. He also led the team to the Final Four of the NCAA Tournament that season, falling to eventual champion, UNLV. He entered the NBA Draft after his junior season, foregoing his senior year. In 2002, Scott was named to the ACC 50th Anniversary men's basketball team honoring the 50 greatest players in ACC History.

NBA career

Orlando Magic 
Scott spent the majority of his career with the Magic, earning the nickname 3-D for his ability to consistently make long three-point field goal attempts. Until the drafting of Shaquille O'Neal in 1992, Scott and Nick Anderson were the leading scorers for the Magic. In 1995–96 Scott set an NBA single-season three-point field goal tally with 267 (which was broken ten years later by Ray Allen). He also set the then NBA record for most three-pointers made in a single game, with 11 on April 18, 1996.  On his record-breaking shot, the assist came from teammate and the holder of the record, Brian Shaw (he made 10 three-pointers on April 8, 1993).  This record has also since been broken by Kobe Bryant who made 12 three-pointers on January 7, 2003, Donyell Marshall who made 12 three-pointers on March 12, 2005, and Stephen Curry who made 12 three-pointers on February 27, 2016; Curry's teammate Klay Thompson now owns the record after making 14 baskets from behind the arc against the Chicago Bulls on October 29, 2018.

Scott was involved in a controversy after an incident at a Virginia summer camp in which he ranted and played explicit rap music in front of a crowd of bewildered children in 1997.

Scott was honored by the Magic on March 26, 2006 as part of their "Remember the Past Nights" program, where the Magic remembers past players for their accomplishments. Other players to be honored so far were Nick Anderson and Scott Skiles.  In 2008, Jay Bilas ranked his personal shooters in NCAA history and Scott was #1 on his list.

Rest of career 
In addition to his seven-year career with Orlando, Scott also spent short stints with other teams. On September 24, 1997, he was traded to the Dallas Mavericks for Derek Harper and Ed O'Bannon. Scott had been traded to the Mavericks after a tumultuous off-season where Scott, frustrated over playing for the Magic as well as with the Magic organization, had a meltdown at a Summer camp event he was a guest at for children, blaring music with explicit lyrics and throwing thinly-veiled insults at the Magic organization. Midway through the 1997–98 season, the Mavericks traded Scott to the Phoenix Suns for Cedric Ceballos. He also played for the New York Knicks, Minnesota Timberwolves (1998–99) and the Vancouver Grizzlies (1999–2000). Scott did not play in the 2000–01 NBA season after being cut by the Washington Wizards in training camp. In 2001, he attempted an NBA comeback with the Los Angeles Lakers (with ex-Orlando teammates Shaquille O'Neal and Brian Shaw) but due to the abundance of veteran talent already on the roster, the Lakers decided to go with another player and cut Scott after training camp.

Post-playing career

Currently Scott serves as a commentator for Turner Sports.

Scott has also served as general manager of the Atlanta Vision of the American Basketball Association.

NBA career statistics
A list of Scott's career statistics:

Regular season

|-
| style="text-align:left;"| 
| style="text-align:left;"| Orlando
| 82 || 73 || 28.5 || .425 || .374 || .750 || 2.9 || 1.6 || 0.8 || .3 || 15.7
|-
| style="text-align:left;"| 
| style="text-align:left;"| Orlando
| 18 || 15 || 33.8 || .402 || .326 || .901 || 3.7 || 1.9 || 1.1 || .5 || 19.9
|-
| style="text-align:left;"| 
| style="text-align:left;"| Orlando
| 54 || 43 || 32.6 || .431 || .403 || .786 || 3.4 || 2.5 || 1.1 || .3 || 15.9
|-
| style="text-align:left;"| 
| style="text-align:left;"| Orlando
| 82 || 37 || 27.8 || .405 || .399 || .774 || 2.7 || 2.6 || 1.0 || .4 || 12.8
|-
| style="text-align:left;"| 
| style="text-align:left;"| Orlando
| 62 || 10 || 24.2 || .439 || .426 || .754 || 2.4 || 2.1 || 0.7 || .2 || 12.9
|-
| style="text-align:left;"| 
| style="text-align:left;"| Orlando
| 82 || 82 || 37.1 || .440 || .425 || .820 || 3.8 || 3.0 || 1.1 || .4 || 17.5
|-
| style="text-align:left;"| 
| style="text-align:left;"| Orlando
| 66 || 62 || 32.8 || .398 || .394 || .792 || 3.1 || 2.1 || 1.1 || .3 || 12.5
|-
| style="text-align:left;"| 
| style="text-align:left;"| Dallas
| 52 || 42 || 34.6 || .387 || .344 || .822 || 3.8 || 2.5 || 0.8 || .6 || 13.6
|-
| style="text-align:left;"| 
| style="text-align:left;"| Phoenix
| 29 || 3 || 17.0 || .438 || .449 || .667 || 1.7 || 0.8 || 0.3 || .2 || 6.2
|-
| style="text-align:left;"| 
| style="text-align:left;"| New York
| 15 || 0 || 13.7 || .304 || .276 || .250 || 1.3 || 0.5 || 0.2 || .1 || 2.9
|-
| style="text-align:left;"| 
| style="text-align:left;"| Minnesota
| 21 || 9 || 25.3 || .446 || .426 || .815 || 1.8 || 1.5 || 0.6 || .1 || 9.1
|-
| style="text-align:left;"| 
| style="text-align:left;"| Vancouver
| 66 || 0 || 19.1 || .375 || .376 || .842 || 1.6 || 1.0 || 0.4 || .1 || 5.6
|-
| style="text-align:center;" colspan="2" | Career
| 629 || 376 || 28.6 || .417 || .397 || .793 || 2.8 || 2.1 || 0.8 || .3 || 12.9

Playoffs

|-
| style="text-align:left;"| 1994
| style="text-align:left;"| Orlando
| 3 || 3 || 33.0 || .341 || .318 || .800 || 2.0 || 1.0 || 0.7 || 1.0 || 14.3
|-
| style="text-align:left;"| 1995
| style="text-align:left;"| Orlando
| 21 || 15 || 35.5 || .413 || .371 || .850 || 3.0 || 2.1 || 1.0 || .2 || 14.7
|-
| style="text-align:left;"| 1996
| style="text-align:left;"| Orlando
| 12 || 12 || 37.2 || .414 || .377 || .636 || 3.6 || 1.9 || 0.8 || .1 || 11.3
|-
| style="text-align:left;"| 1997
| style="text-align:left;"| Orlando
| 5 || 1 || 18.8 || .261 || .273 || .000 || 1.8 || 1.0 || 0.4 || .0 || 3.0
|-
| style="text-align:left;"| 1998
| style="text-align:left;"| Phoenix
| 4 || 0 || 15.5 || .412 || .375 || .000 || 2.0 || 0.3 || 0.3 || .0 || 4.3
|-
| style="text-align:center;" colspan="2" | Career
| 45 || 31 || 32.2 || .399 || .364 || .778 || 2.9 || 1.7 || 0.8 || .2 || 11.5

References

External links
nba.com historical playerfile
"Dennis Scott Bio"
hawks.com

1968 births
Living people
20th-century African-American sportspeople
21st-century African-American people
African-American basketball players
All-American college men's basketball players
American expatriate basketball people in Canada
American men's basketball players
Basketball players from Maryland
Dallas Mavericks players
Georgia Tech Yellow Jackets men's basketball players
McDonald's High School All-Americans
Minnesota Timberwolves players
New York Knicks players
Orlando Magic draft picks
Orlando Magic players
Parade High School All-Americans (boys' basketball)
Participants in American reality television series
Phoenix Suns players
Radio personalities from Atlanta
Small forwards
Vancouver Grizzlies players